H0 (H followed by zero) or H00 may refer to:

 H0 scale, used in rail transport modelling 
 Higgs boson, in physics, symbol H0
 Hammett acidity function, in chemistry, H0
 Hubble constant, in cosmology, H0
 Null hypothesis, in statistics, often denoted H0
 , a British and later Canadian warship
 Stye, a bacterial infection of the eyelid, ICD-10 code H00

See also
0H (disambiguation)